Jonathan Emanuel Castillo (born 5 January 1993) is an Argentine footballer who plays as a defender for Siracusa.

Career

In 2014, Castillo signed for Sportivo Italiano in the Argentine third division after playing for Boca Juniors, Argentina's most successful club.

In 2016, he signed for Argentine fourth division side Luján from Chungju Hummel in the South Korean second division.

In 2017, he signed for Argentine fourth division team Deportivo Armenio before joining Siracusa in the Italian fifth division.

References

External links
 

Argentine footballers
Argentine expatriate sportspeople in Italy
K League 2 players
Living people
Expatriate footballers in South Korea
Expatriate footballers in Italy
Chungju Hummel FC players
Sportspeople from Buenos Aires Province
Club Luján footballers
Argentino de Quilmes players
Deportivo Armenio footballers
Sportivo Italiano footballers
Boca Juniors footballers
Primera B Metropolitana players
Siracusa Calcio players
Association football defenders
1993 births
People from Florencio Varela Partido